Mikhail Tarkhanov may refer to:

Mikhail Tarkhanov (actor) (1877-1948), Russian and Soviet actor
Mikhail Tarkhanov (painter) (1888-1962), Russian and Soviet painter